Shine TV is a British media production company and part of Banijay with offices in London and Manchester.

Shine was founded in March 2001 by Elisabeth Murdoch, daughter of News Corporation CEO Rupert Murdoch. The company was 80% owned by Elisabeth Murdoch, 15% by Lord Alli, and 5% by BSkyB, which signed a deal guaranteeing to buy an agreed amount of Shine programming for two years.

Programming 
100 Greatest Sexy Moments - three-hour documentary countdown broadcast on Channel Four that explored the "turn ons" of the average Briton
Battle of the Brains - team played game show on BBC Two presented by Paddy O'Connell
The Biggest Loser - reality weight loss show on ITV1 presented by Kate Garraway in 2009 (daytime edition) and Davina McCall in 2011 (primetime edition)
Charles & Camilla: Madly In Love - documentary broadcast on Sky One tracing the path of the relationship between the Prince of Wales and the Duchess of Cornwall from their first meeting to their marriage in 2005
Demons - supernatural drama series that premiered on ITV and ITVBe on 3 January 2009
Gladiators - the 2008–2009 revival of the game show on Sky One
Got to Dance - dance reality series that premiered on Sky 1 in January 2010
Hex - supernatural drama that aired on Sky One in 2004–2005
Masterchef Goes Large -  Celebrity Masterchef  - revived version of the cookery show, starring Gregg Wallace and John Torode; the latest in the Masterchef format is Masterchef: The Professionals, with judges Gregg Wallace and Michel Roux
Merlin - fantasy action adventure series for BBC1
Sugar Rush - comedy drama series based on the novel by Julie Burchill that was broadcast on Channel 4 in 2005–2006
The Unofficial World Records of Sex (UWROS) - x-rated comedy broadcast on Sky One that explores record breaking feats of a biological nature
The What in the World? Quiz - scientific panel game hosted by Marcus Brigstocke for Five
Hunted - Channel 4 reality show where a group of every day civilians are willingly sent on the run from a team known as hunters, for 28 days
The Heist - Sky One reality competition where a group of every day citizens commit a robbery and hide from the a team of police detectives.

References

External links 
shine.tv Official website

Television production companies of the United Kingdom
Mass media companies established in 2001
Banijay
Film production companies of the United Kingdom